Rouvray-Catillon is a commune in the Seine-Maritime department in the Normandy region in northern France.

Geography

Population

Places of interest
 The eighteenth-century church of St. Martin.
 The church of Notre-Dame, dating from the eighteenth century.
 A museum in a 16th-century manorhouse.
 A seventeenth-century château.
The chapel of St. Samson, dating from the nineteenth century.

See also
Communes of the Seine-Maritime department

References

Communes of Seine-Maritime